Petting Zoo is a 2015 internationally co-produced drama film directed by Micah Magee. It was screened in the Panorama section of the 65th Berlin International Film Festival.

Cast
 Devon Keller
 Kiowa Tucker as Danny

References

External links
 

2015 films
2015 drama films
German drama films
2010s German-language films
2010s English-language films
2010s German films